Colin Gerard Tan (born 13 July 1977) is a technology entrepreneur and Singaporean poet. His works have been performed in Australia and the United Kingdom, where he did his postgraduate studies at Cambridge. He is the founder of Rentlord, one of the earliest fully online property management portals in the UK allowing landlords and tenants to manage every aspect of a property tenancy over the internet.

Biography
Tan was born in Singapore and educated in St Andrew's Primary and Secondary School. After mandatory military service, he studied English literature at the National University of Singapore, where the poets Edwin Thumboo and Lee Tzu Pheng were his tutors and mentors.

After that he worked in human rights at Franciscans International, a non-governmental organisation in Geneva representing the poor at the United Nations.

Tan became a student at the University of Cambridge's English department's first cohort of the Masters programme in Critical Theory. He received a Cambridge Commonwealth Trust scholarship to study his PhD on Aesthetic Theory in the writings of Walter Benjamin and Immanuel Kant. During this period, he also tutored at St John's College. At Cambridge, he was a contemporary of the Singaporean poet in Chinese Chee Lay Tan, who was also doing his doctoral thesis, and with whom Tan collaborated artistically on poetry translations of each other.

Creative Works

In Melbourne, he collaborated with composer Michael Easton. Together they wrote I Chose to Climb, a multimedia play with music, for the Port Fairy Spring Music Festival, which Tan also directed. The play was later published in his poetry collection, The Evidence of the Senses. It played also in London at the Royal Academy of Music.

In England, Tan's text has been set to music by Gabriel Jackson. His sequel to Addison's Spacious Firmament premiered at St Margaret's Church, Westminster Abbey, and was commissioned for the John Armitage Trust.

Tan has been anthologised in Singapore and his writing taught in the classroom. In 2001, he was one of the winners of the National Arts Council Golden Point Awards.

Entrepreneurship

While living as a tenant in London, Tan conceived that the process of property management would be much faster and more efficient if it was done online. In 2008, together with civil law barrister Sarah Lau and fellow academic Kok Hong Cheong, a lecturer of computer science at Republic Polytechnic, he began developing Rentlord.

In 2010, Rentlord was featured by PayPal at its Innovate Conference held in San Francisco, which Tan and Cheong presented at. It was invested in as a technology startup by prominent UK accelerator programs Seedcamp and the Silicon Valley-based 500 Startups. Tan and Cheong also demoed Rentlord to the primarily Silicon Valley audience at TechCrunch Disrupt, where it was featured as an Editors Choice.

Selected Writing

 The Evidence of the Senses (2007, Ethos Books) 
 Angeli, Archangeli (Oxford Univ. Press)
 Yet We Who Neither Burn Nor Shine (Oxford Univ. Press)
 &Words: Poems Singapore and Beyond (Anthology)
 Fifty on 50 (Anthology)
 Over There: Poems from Singapore and Australia
 "Time Logs" (Artwork/Collaboration)

References

1977 births
Living people
National University of Singapore alumni
Singaporean non-fiction writers
Singaporean poets
Saint Andrew's School, Singapore alumni
Alumni of the University of Cambridge
Singaporean businesspeople
Singaporean people of Chinese descent